River Lake may refer to:

River Lake (Winter Haven, Florida), a lake in the U.S.
River Lake (Nova Scotia), several lakes in Canada
Fluvial lake, a lake on a river

See also

 Rural Municipality of Lake of the Rivers No. 72, Saskatchewan, Canada
Lake River, a river in the U.S.

River (disambiguation)
Lake (disambiguation)